V.I.P. is an American action/comedy-drama series, which ran from 1998 to 2002 in syndication. Below is a list of all episodes.

Series overview

Episodes

Season 1 (1998–99)

Season 2 (1999–2000)

Season 3 (2000–01)

Season 4 (2001–02)

External links
 

Lists of action television series episodes
Lists of American comedy-drama television series episodes